Skylar Star Stecker (born April 24, 2002) is an American singer and actress. In 2015, she released her debut studio album, This Is Me. In March 2019, she independently released her second album, Redemption.

Life
Born on April 24, 2002, in Tampa, Florida, Stecker is the daughter of Aaron Stecker and Kara Hendricks. She has a brother, Dorsett. She was raised in Wisconsin. She has been a vegan since January 2015.

Career
Stecker's career began when she performed at the 2012 International Modeling & Talent Association Awards in Los Angeles, where she was awarded Best Singer and Most Sought After Talent. In 2012, she sang the national anthem at Wisconsin Badgers, New Orleans Saints, UCLA, and Green Bay Packers games, as well as a NASCAR race. She performed the national anthem more than one hundred times, including at an Anaheim Angels' game in May 2014.

In August 2013, she began actively recording and releasing cover videos on her YouTube channel. In the fall of 2013, Stecker had a guest-starring role in the ABC comedy Super Fun Night.

Her first studio album, This Is Me, was released on September 25, 2015. In September 2015, Stecker was picked as Elvis Duran's Artist of the Month, and was featured on NBC's Today where she performed her single "Crazy Beautiful".

"Rooftop" debuted on the Dance Club Songs chart at No. 45 on June 13, 2015. It peaked at No. 11 on July 25, 2015. She also appeared in 2015's Holiday Music Special. She released another version of her album This Is Me in June 2016, titled This Is Me: Signature Version. In September 2016, her cover of Sweet Dreams with JX Riders reached number 1 on the Dance Club Songs chart.

On March 10, 2017, Stecker released the single "Only Want You". It was written by Crystal Carr and Shantee "Kissie Lee" Tyler and produced by Tricky Stewart. Following the release of "Only Want You", she was named Radio Disney's Next Big Thing in May 2017. "Only Want You" became Stecker's second number one on Billboard's Dance Club Songs Chart in its September 2, 2017 issue.

Stecker's song, "Crazy Beautiful", was used in The Sims 4 soundtrack, where she recorded the song entirely in the Simlish language used in the game. It is available to play through music devices during gameplay.

In 2015, Stecker portrayed Ridley in two episodes of Austin & Ally, "Karaoke & Kalamity" and "Mini-Me's & Muffin Baskets".

Stecker's song, "How Did We", was featured on the soundtrack for the 2017 film Everything, Everything. Prior to the release of the soundtrack and film, she released a music video for the song featuring scenes from the movie. Stecker released a single titled "Blame" on October 27, 2017, which became her third number one on Billboard's Dance Club Songs Chart in its March 24, 2018 issue. She then released a new Christmas single called "This Year" on November 2, 2017.

In May 2018, Stecker, formerly with Interscope and Cherrytree, became an independent artist. She also performed the national anthem at the Los Angeles Chargers' season opener home game in September 2018 and the Los Angeles Lakers' game in October 2018.

On March 15, 2019, Stecker released her second studio album, "Redemption", her first independent release. Shortly after its release, Stecker performed the national anthem at an Anaheim Ducks game. Her LA release show for the album, held at The Roxy, sold out, and was followed by a show in Madison, Wisconsin.

In 2020 and 2021, Stecker has released a number of singles. On October 16, 2020, Stecker released a duo of songs called "Figure You Out" and "Really". On November 13, Stecker released a cover of "In Da Club" by 50 Cent. Stecker released a holiday song called "This Christmas" on December 10. On January 15, 2021, Stecker released a single called "Superman". On February 24, Stecker released another song called "FWY". On April 23, Stecker released a song called "Questions".

Influence
Her main influences are Bruno Mars, Beyoncé, Christina Aguilera and Alicia Keys.

Discography

Studio albums

Extended plays

Singles

Filmography

Awards and nominations

References

External links
 
 
 

2002 births
Living people
21st-century American actresses
21st-century American women singers
Actresses from Tampa, Florida
American child actresses
American child singers
American women pop singers
American television actresses
Child pop musicians
Interscope Records artists
Singers from Florida
Musicians from Tampa, Florida
21st-century American singers